John Raphael Bocco (born 5 August 1989) is a Tanzanian international footballer who plays for Simba, as a striker.

Club career
Born in Dar es Salaam, Bocco began his career with Azam for nearly 10 years.

He signed a two-year contract with Simba in June 2017. He signed a new two-year contract in April 2021.

International career
He made his senior international debut for Tanzania in 2009, and has appeared in FIFA World Cup qualifying matches.

International goals
Scores and results list Tanzania's goal tally first.

References

1989 births
Living people
People from Dar es Salaam
Tanzanian footballers
Tanzania international footballers
Azam F.C. players
Simba S.C. players
Association football forwards
2019 Africa Cup of Nations players
Tanzanian Premier League players
Tanzania A' international footballers
2020 African Nations Championship players